An adventurer is a person who adventures.

Adventurer may also refer to:

 An archaic term for a shareholder of a joint-stock company, such as the Virginia Company of London
 Adventurers' Act, a 1642 Act of the English Parliament intended to stop the "rebellion" in Ireland
 Adventure Air Adventurer, an American flying boat design
 Adventurers (land drainage), groups of engineers and landowners who funded large-scale drainage projects in return for land
 Adventurers (Seventh-day Adventist), a program for children of the Seventh-Day Adventist Church
 Adventurers!, a webcomic
 DeSoto Adventurer, an automobile
 Lego Adventurers, a Lego theme
 Triumph Adventurer 900, a motorcycle
 , two ferries
 Adventurer (film), a 1942 Swedish film

See also
The Adventurer (disambiguation)
The Adventurers (disambiguation)
Conan the Adventurer (disambiguation)